The following is a list of the 31 municipalities (comuni) of the Province of Matera, Basilicata, Italy.

List

See also
List of municipalities of Italy

References

Matera